Matayba is a genus of flowering plants belonging to the family Sapindaceae.

Its native range is Mexico to Tropical America.

Species
Species:

Matayba adenanthera 
Matayba apetala 
Matayba arborescens 
Matayba atropurpurea 
Matayba ayangannensis 
Matayba boliviana 
Matayba camptoneura 
Matayba clavelligera 
Matayba cristae 
Matayba discolor 
Matayba domingensis 
Matayba elaeagnoides 
Matayba elegans 
Matayba floribunda 
Matayba glaberrima 
Matayba grandis 
Matayba guianensis 
Matayba heterophylla 
Matayba inelegans 
Matayba ingifolia 
Matayba intermedia 
Matayba juglandifolia 
Matayba kavanayena 
Matayba kennedyae 
Matayba leucodictya 
Matayba livescens 
Matayba longipes 
Matayba macrocarpa 
Matayba marginata 
Matayba mexicana 
Matayba mollis 
Matayba obovata 
Matayba opaca 
Matayba oppositifolia 
Matayba pallens 
Matayba paucijuga 
Matayba peruviana 
Matayba ptariana 
Matayba punctata 
Matayba purgans 
Matayba robusta 
Matayba scrobiculata 
Matayba spruceana 
Matayba stenodictya 
Matayba sylvatica 
Matayba talisioides 
Matayba verapazensis 
Matayba yutajensis

References

Sapindaceae
Sapindaceae genera